Jayvon Donnell Graves (born December 29, 1998) is an American professional basketball player for Limoges CSP of the LNB Pro A. He played college basketball for the Buffalo Bulls.

High school career
Graves was born in Malvern, Ohio but grew up in Malvern, Ohio. He began playing basketball at the age of six and was also a star player in baseball and football. He attended St. Vincent–St. Mary High School where he was coached by Dru Joyce II. As a senior, he helped St. Vincent-St. Mary to its first state title since 2011 and 25–5 record. He scored 22 points and grabbed 10 rebounds in the title game. Graves averaged 21.5 points, 4.9 rebounds, and 2.5 assists per game. He shared All-Ohio Player of the Year honors in Division II with Trotwood High School's Torrey Patton, and Graves was named cleveland.com Boys Basketball Player of the Year. In AAU play, he competed for the King James Shooting Stars. Graves was a three-star recruit with offers from 13 schools, including MAC schools Toledo and Kent State, but signed with Buffalo. He said he was drawn to the Bulls because of "the style of play, the atmosphere, closeness to home and the coaching staff," particularly Nate Oats.

College career
As a freshman, Graves played in all 36 games and averaged 5.1 points and 2.3 rebounds per-game. He helped the team finish 27–9 and defeat Arizona in the first round of the NCAA Tournament. As a sophomore, he became a starter, contributing 9.7 points and 4.2 rebounds per game. Graves helped the Bulls finish a school-record 32–4 and defeat Arizona State in the first round of the NCAA Tournament before losing to eventual national runner-up Texas Tech. His best game as a sophomore came on February 19, 2019, when he tallied 26 points in a 114–67 blowout win over Ohio.

Coming into his junior season, Graves was the leading returning scorer on a team that lost C. J. Massinburg, Nick Perkins and Jeremy Harris to graduation. On February 21, 2020, Graves scored a career-high 33 points in a 104–98 double overtime win at Kent State. As a junior, Graves led Buffalo in scoring at 17.1 points per game in addition to averaging 5.4 rebounds and 2.5 assists per game in 32 games, all starts. He set the program record for field goals attempted in a season with 479, and his 204 made field goals are third highest in a season at Buffalo. He was named to the First Team All-MAC. Following the season, he declared for the 2020 NBA draft but did not hire an agent. On June 6, Graves announced he was withdrawing from the draft and returning to Buffalo. On March 2, 2021, he posted a triple-double with 13 points, 11 assists and 10 rebounds in an 80–78 win over Akron. As a senior, Graves averaged 14.2 points, 6.1 rebounds and 3.8 assists per game. He was named to the Second Team All-MAC.

Professional career

Austin Spurs (2021–2022)
After going undrafted in the 2021 NBA draft, Graves signed with the Austin Spurs of the NBA G League on October 27, 2021.

Limoges CSP (2022–present)
He signed with Limoges CSP of the LNB Pro A on July 30, 2022. On December 22, 2022, Graves' NBA G League rights were traded from the Austin Spurs to the Windy City Bulls.

Career statistics

College

|-
| style="text-align:left;"| 2017–18
| style="text-align:left;"| Buffalo
| 36 || 1 || 16.3 || .380 || .325 || .600 || 2.3 || 1.0 || .5 || .8 || 5.1
|-
| style="text-align:left;"| 2018–19 
| style="text-align:left;"| Buffalo
| 36 || 35 || 24.9 || .457 || .372 || .625 || 4.2 || 1.9 || .8 || .8 || 9.7
|-
| style="text-align:left;"| 2019–20 
| style="text-align:left;"| Buffalo 
| 32 || 32 || 34.4 || .426 || .360 || .647 || 5.4 || 2.5 || 1.2 || .7 || 17.1
|-
| style="text-align:left;"| 2020–21
| style="text-align:left;"| Buffalo
| 25 || 25 || 34.4 || .409 || .281 || .575 || 6.1 || 3.8 || 1.4 || .9 || 14.2
|- class="sortbottom"
| style="text-align:center;" colspan="2"| Career
| 129 || 93 || 26.7 || .422 || .340 || .615 || 4.3 || 2.2 || .9 || .8 || 11.1

Personal life
Graves is the son of Brandy Prior and Aaron Graves, and he has an older brother Jalen. His grandfather, James Pryor Jr., was an Ohio state player of the year in high school. Graves is a Christian. He majored in communication with a minor in sociology at Buffalo. He cites LeBron James as his favorite athlete.

References

External links
Buffalo Bulls bio

1998 births
Living people
American men's basketball players
Austin Spurs players
Basketball players from Canton, Ohio
Buffalo Bulls men's basketball players
Limoges CSP players
Point guards
St. Vincent–St. Mary High School alumni